= Aristonides =

Ancient Greek painter living before the 1st century

Aristonides was a painter of ancient Greece of some distinction, mentioned by Pliny the Elder, was the father and instructor of Mnasitimus. We know only that he lived in or before the 1st century.
