= Mnasitimus =

Ancient Greek painter living before the 1st century

Mnasitimus (or Mnesitimus) was a painter of ancient Greece of some renown, mentioned by Pliny the Elder in his Natural History. He was the son and disciple of the painter Aristonides.
